Driving licence in Turkey is a document issued by the relevant government agency, regional or local security force, confirming the holder is qualified to drive motor vehicles. Driving licence exams are regulated by the Ministry of National Education while the licence is issued by the General Directorate of Security.

On 1 January 2016, new laws concerning Turkish driving licences were implemented. The changes are intended to bring Turkey more in line with existing European Union driving regulations and concern all road users in Turkey. A foreign national can drive in Turkey with an EU licence for six months. After six months, it must be converted to a Turkish licence. Application can be made to any Traffic Registration office, and the foreign driving licences will not be returned to holders. Instead they will be sent to the issuing authority of the country of origin. For example, applications made by British nationals will be sent to the Driver and Vehicle Licensing Agency (DVLA). The DVLA says that expats can drive in the UK on a Turkish licence for up to twelve months, and if they wish to settle in the UK, the Turkish licence cannot be exchanged for a UK licence and a practical test has to be passed. 

In Turkey, you must be at least eighteen years old in order to drive a car and at least sixteen to drive a motorbike. The driving test comprises a practical and theory test, which has been recently made tougher in order to meet European Union regulations.

Requirements to attend a driving course 
In order to take lessons, applicant must fulfill these requirements / bring documents:

 Original and photocopy of Turkish ID card
 Health report (Must be obtained from authorized health institutions)
 Two biometric photos
 Criminal record certificate
Education Certificate (At least Primary Education Degree required)

Requirements for Turkish citizens
In order to get a licence, applicant must fulfill these requirements / bring documents:

 Drivers Certificate
 Original and photocopy of ID card
 Health Report
 Blood group document
 Two photos, one biometric photo
 Driver's licence card fees
 Criminal record certificate
 Finger print

Requirements for foreigners
Application forms available from the Driver’s Association office (Şoförler Odasi) at the local Transport Registration Department. Requirements:
 valid foreign driving licence
 Notarised Turkish translation of the driving licence
 copy of the residence permit (Ikamet) or Turkish identification card
 photographs (required at various steps of the process)
 Original c which can be obtained from the local court house (valid 12-months from issue)
 Original health report by a local state health centre (Sağlık Ocağı) or private clinic; photos required (valid 12-months from issue)
 Blood group certificate (can be requested from a clinic or health centre)
 Receipt from the tax authorities showing that the relevant driving licence fee has been paid (cost depends 
 
 Validity #NA

Classes

See also
 European driving licence
 Turkish identity card
 Turkish passport
 Vehicle registration plates of Turkey

References

External links

Turkey